Archaeoprepona chromus is a species of Neotropical charaxine butterflies in the family Nymphalidae, native to South America.

Taxonomy
The following subspecies are recognised:
Archaeoprepona chromus chromus (Guérin-Ménéville, 1844) (Colombia, Bolivia, Venezuela, Peru, Argentina)
Archaeoprepona chromus priene (Hewitson, 1869) (Colombia)

Description
The wingspan is about 85 mm.

Distribution and habitat
Montane forest at 1500 to 2000 metres in the Neotropical realm.

References

Rydon, AHB. 1971. The systematics of the Charaxidae (Lepidoptera: Nymphaloidea). Entomologist's Record 83: 219-233, 283-287, 310-316, 336-341, 384-388, 6 figs., 4 plates.

Charaxinae
Nymphalidae of South America
Monotypic butterfly genera
Nymphalidae genera